Leewards Creative Crafts, or Leewards, was an American crafts and fabrics retailer. It was founded in Elgin, Illinois, in 1947. The chain had approximately 87 stores at its peak. In 1994, it was purchased by Michaels.

References

Arts and crafts retailers
Defunct companies based in Illinois
American companies established in 1945
Retail companies established in 1945
Retail companies disestablished in 1994